Russell Harold Lester Smith (born 22 November 1946) is an Australian politician. He was a Liberal Party member of the New South Wales Legislative Assembly from 1988 to 2003, representing the electorate of Bega.

Smith was a farmer and businessman before entering state politics. He had also served as a councillor and deputy president of both the Bombala Council and the Monaro County Council. Smith was preselected as the Liberal candidate for the newly re-established safe Liberal seat of electoral district of Bega at the 1988 election and was easily elected. He was re-elected three more times, and retired at the 2003 election, when he was succeeded by Andrew Constance.

References

 

1946 births
Liberal Party of Australia members of the Parliament of New South Wales
Living people
Members of the New South Wales Legislative Assembly
21st-century Australian politicians